Lofti Ben Sassi (born 27 October 1965) is a Tunisian footballer. He played in two matches for the Tunisia national football team in 1994. He was also named in Tunisia's squad for the 1994 African Cup of Nations tournament.

References

1965 births
Living people
Tunisian footballers
Tunisia international footballers
1994 African Cup of Nations players
Association football midfielders
People from Béja